The 802.9 Working Group of the IEEE 802 networking committee developed standards for integrated voice and data access over existing Category 3 twisted-pair network cable installations. Its major standard was usually known as isoEthernet. 

IsoEthernet combines 10 megabits per second Ethernet and 96 64-kilobits per second  ISDN B channels. It was originally developed to provide data and voice/video over the same wire without degradation by fixing the amount of bandwidth assigned to the Ethernet and B-channel sides.

There was some vendor support for isoEthernet, but it lost in the marketplace due to the rapid adoption of Fast Ethernet and the working group was disbanded.

References
IEEE Std 802-1990: IEEE Standards for Local and Metropolitan Networks: Overview and Architecture New York:1990

IEEE 802
Telecommunications standards